Mark Peters (born 6 July 1972) is a Welsh former professional footballer who played as a defender. He made over 230 appearances in the Football League.

Career

Playing career
Peters began his career as a trainee at Manchester City in 1990 before spending the 1992–93 season at Norwich City. He moved to Peterborough United in August 1993, where he made his first team debut in 1993. Spells at Mansfield Town and Rushden & Diamonds between 1994 and 2003 yielded over 200 appearances with 18 goals. He joined Rushden in May 1999 and helped them win the Conference National title in 2001 and to promotion to Division Two (now League One) in 2003. He was released by Rushden in September 2003 when his contract was cancelled by mutual consent, and joined Leyton Orient.

Peters spent two seasons with Leyton Orient, where after being a regular in his first season, he only made one start in the 2004–05 season before joining Aldershot Town on a one-month loan in November 2004. A foot injury then interrupted his season and he did not play again until April 2005. He left Orient at the end of the season and joined Cambridge United in August 2005, where he combined playing coaching. He joined King's Lynn on a one-year contract in July 2008.

Coaching career
In 2009 Peters joined St Albans City as player/assistant manager and youth team coach. He later joined Corby Town, initially as youth manager, becoming assistant manager. Following the resignation of manager Chris Plummer in August 2013, he was made interim manager until Tommy Wright and Andrew Wilson were appointed in September, after which he returned to the post of youth coach. He subsequently worked at the FootballCV Academy, before becoming Head of Academy Coaching at Mansfield Town in June 2015. He returned to Corby Town as manager in February 2020, He left at the end of 2019–20 season.

References

External links

1972 births
Living people
Sportspeople from St Asaph
Welsh footballers
Cambridge United F.C. players
Peterborough United F.C. players
Mansfield Town F.C. players
Leyton Orient F.C. players
Wales under-21 international footballers
Manchester City F.C. players
Norwich City F.C. players
Rushden & Diamonds F.C. players
Aldershot Town F.C. players
King's Lynn F.C. players
St Albans City F.C. players
Weymouth F.C. players
Mansfield Town F.C. non-playing staff
Association football defenders
Corby Town F.C. managers
Welsh football managers